10 Things I Hate About You is a 1999 American teen romantic comedy film directed by Gil Junger and starring Julia Stiles, Heath Ledger, Joseph Gordon-Levitt, and Larisa Oleynik. The screenplay, by Karen McCullah Lutz and Kirsten Smith, is a modernization of William Shakespeare's comedy The Taming of the Shrew, retold in a late-1990s American high school setting. In the story, new student Cameron (Gordon-Levitt) is smitten with Bianca (Oleynik) and, in order to get around her father's strict rules on dating, attempts to get bad boy Patrick (Ledger) to date Bianca's ill-tempered sister, Kat (Stiles). The film is named after a poem Kat writes about her romance with Patrick. Much of the filming took place in the Seattle metropolitan area, with many scenes shot at Stadium High School in Tacoma.

Released on March 31, 1999, 10 Things I Hate About You grossed over $60 million and received generally positive reviews from critics. It had breakthrough roles for Stiles, Ledger, and Gordon-Levitt, all of whom were nominated for various teen-oriented awards. The film has since developed a cult following and is considered a classic in the teen film genre. Ten years later, it was adapted into a television series of the same title, which ran for 20 episodes and featured Larry Miller reprising his role as Walter Stratford.

Plot
In Padua Hills, a fictional town near Seattle, new sophomore student Cameron (Joseph Gordon-Levitt) instantly falls head over heels for the girl of his dreams: popular and wealthy sophomore Bianca (Larisa Oleynik), but learns that her father has prohibited her from dating until her ill-tempered, hot-headed older sister Kat (Julia Stiles), who is a senior and eagerly awaiting the moment she can leave town for college in the fall, gets a boyfriend. In attempt to solve his problem, Cameron's new friend, the wealthy aspiring model and self-absorbed senior Joey Donner (Andrew Keegan) finds the only guy who could possibly be a match for Kat: Patrick Verona (Heath Ledger) , a mysterious bad boy who is a junior and has a nasty reputation of his own. For $500, Patrick has to go out and break Kat's heart before the end of the school year, but while hanging out with her, he develops feelings for her as she becomes more vulnerable to him than she has with anyone else.

Cast
 Julia Stiles as Katarina "Kat" Stratford, the antisocial, shrewish elder Stratford sister
 Heath Ledger as Patrick Verona, the Australian "bad boy" hired to date Kat
 Joseph Gordon-Levitt as Cameron James, the new student at Padua High School who is smitten with Bianca and goes to great lengths to win her over
 Larisa Oleynik as Bianca Stratford, the younger Stratford sister, superficial and popular
 Larry Miller as Walter Stratford, an obstetrician and single parent who is overprotective of his daughters
 Andrew Keegan as Joey Donner, an affluent, self-absorbed high school senior and aspiring model who intends to have sex with Bianca, and to that end pays Patrick to date Kat
 David Krumholtz as Michael Eckman, a geek who assists Cameron in his quest to woo Bianca, and in the process tries to woo Kat's friend Mandella
 Susan May Pratt as Mandella, Kat's only close friend and an aficionado of William Shakespeare
 Gabrielle Union as Chastity Church, Bianca's best friend
 Daryl Mitchell as Mr. Morgan, teacher of Kat, Patrick, and Joey's English class
 Allison Janney as Ms. Perky, Padua High School's guidance counselor and a writer of erotic literature
 David Leisure as Mr. Chapin, coach of the girls' soccer team
 Greg Jackson as "Scurvy", a friend of Patrick
 Kyle Cease as Bogey Lowenstein, a golf enthusiast and member of a clique of aspiring MBAs
 The band Letters to Cleo (singer Kay Hanley, guitarists Greg McKenna and Michael Eisenstein, bassist Scott Riebling, and drummer Jason Sutter) appears as the band performing at Club Skunk, playing their songs "Come On" and "Co-Pilot", and a cover of Cheap Trick's "I Want You to Want Me" on the school's rooftop during the closing credits. Hanley and Eisenstein also appear in the prom scene, performing a cover of Nick Lowe's "Cruel to Be Kind" with Save Ferris.
 The band Save Ferris (singer Monique Powell, guitarist Brian Mashburn, bassist Bill Uechi, trumpeter José Castellaños, trombonist Brian Williams, saxophonist Eric Zamora, and drummer Evan Kilbourne) appears as the band performing at the prom, playing their songs "I Know" and "Can't Stop" as well as covers of The Isley Brothers' "Shout" and Nick Lowe's "Cruel to Be Kind".

Production
The script was finalized in November 1997. Many of the scenes were filmed on location at Stadium High School and at a house in the North End of Tacoma, Washington. The prom sequence was shot over three days in Seattle. Costume designer Kim Tillman designed original dresses for Oleynik and Stiles, as well as the period outfits for Pratt and Krumholtz. Union's snakeskin prom dress is a Betsey Johnson design. Ledger's and Gordon-Levitt's vintage tuxes came from Isadora's in Seattle.

Josh Hartnett and Ashton Kutcher were in the running to play Patrick. Eliza Dushku auditioned for the role of Kat. Katie Holmes was also considered for the role. Kate Hudson was offered the part but her mother, Goldie Hawn, didn't like the script, so she passed on the role.

Release
In its opening weekend, the film grossed $8.3 million in 2,271 theaters domestically (averaging $3,668 per venue), finishing second at the box office, behind The Matrix. It grossed a total of $38.2 million in the U.S. and Canada, and $15.3 million in other territories, for $53.5 million worldwide.

Reception
On review aggregator Rotten Tomatoes, the film holds an approval rating of 71% based on 82 reviews, with an average rating of 6.3/10. The website's critics consensus states: "Julia Stiles and Heath Ledger add strong performances to an unexpectedly clever script, elevating 10 Things (slightly) above typical teen fare." Metacritic assigned the film a weighted average score of 70 out of 100, based on 26 critics, indicating "generally favorable reviews." Audiences polled by CinemaScore gave the film an average grade of "B" on an A+ to F scale.

Geoff Andrew from Time Out praised the film's leads, writing, "Stiles grows into her character, and Ledger is effortlessly charming." Brad Laidman of Film Threat said the film was "pure of heart and perfectly executed." Ron Wells, also of Film Threat, wrote, "Of all the teen films released this year, this one is, by far, the best." Roger Ebert gave the film two and a half stars out of four, saying that he "liked the movie's spirit, the actors and some of the scenes. The music, much of it by the band Letters to Cleo, is subtle and inventive while still cheerful. The movie almost but not quite achieves liftoff against the gravitational pull of the tired story formula." Entertainment Weekly put the film 49th on its list of Best High School Movies.

Accolades
10 Things I Hate About You provided breakthrough roles for Stiles, Ledger, and Gordon-Levitt. Gordon-Levitt, Stiles, and Oleynik each received Young Star Award nominations for Best Actor/Actress in a Comedy Film. The movie was nominated for seven Teen Choice Awards: Choice Movie: Breakout Star (Stiles), Choice Movie: Comedy, Choice Movie: Funniest Scene (featuring Krumholtz), Choice Movie: Love Scene (featuring Stiles and Ledger), Choice Movie: Hissy Fit (Gordon-Levitt), Choice Movie: Villain (Andrew Keegan) and Choice Movie: Soundtrack. The film's casting directors Marcia Ross and Donna Morong won "Best Casting for Feature Film, Comedy" at the Casting Society of America in 1999. In 2000, Stiles won the CFCA Award for Most Promising Actress (tied with Émilie Dequenne in Rosetta) and an MTV Movie Award for Breakthrough Female Performance. Ledger was also nominated for an MTV Movie Award for Best Musical Performance for the song "Can't Take My Eyes Off You".

Soundtrack
The film's soundtrack album, featuring Letters to Cleo performing cover versions of Cheap Trick's "I Want You to Want Me" and Nick Lowe's "Cruel to Be Kind", stayed on the Billboard 200 chart for seven weeks, peaking at no. 52. Reviewer S. Peeples of AllMusic rated it 3 stars out of 5, calling it "one of the best modern rock soundtracks of the spring 1999 season".

Certifications

Adaptations
In June 1999, the Scholastic Corporation published a novelization of the story, adapted by David Levithan. The story is retold as it is in the film, with each chapter written from the point of view of either Bianca, Cameron, Kat, Patrick, or Michael.

In October 2008, ABC Family ordered a pilot episode of 10 Things I Hate About You, a half-hour, single-camera comedy series based on the film. Larry Miller is the only actor from the film to reprise his role in the TV series. The director of the film, Gil Junger, directed many of the episodes, including the pilot; the film's composer, Richard Gibbs, also returned to do the show's music. The series was adapted and produced by Carter Covington. The show premiered on July 7, 2009, and ended on May 24, 2010, lasting 20 episodes.

References

External links

 
 
 

1999 films
1999 directorial debut films
1990s coming-of-age comedy films
1990s feminist films
1990s high school films
1999 romantic comedy films
1990s teen comedy films
1990s teen romance films
American coming-of-age comedy films
American feminist films
American high school films
American romantic comedy films
American teen comedy films
American teen romance films
Coming-of-age romance films
1990s English-language films
Films about proms
Films adapted into television shows
Films based on The Taming of the Shrew
Films directed by Gil Junger
Films scored by Richard Gibbs
Films set in Seattle
Films set in Washington (state)
Films shot in Seattle
Films shot in Washington (state)
Modern adaptations of works by William Shakespeare
Teen films based on works by William Shakespeare
Touchstone Pictures films
Films about sisters
Films about father–daughter relationships
1990s American films